Keshlii (also Kashliid as Keshlii; also known as Kashlii and Keshlii) is a village in Keshlii Rural District, Kargan Rud District, Talesh County, Gilan Province, Iran. At the 2006 census, its population was 273, in 67 families.

References 

Populated places in Talesh County